The Greensand Way is a long-distance path of  in southeast England, from Haslemere in Surrey to Hamstreet in Kent. It follows the Greensand Ridge along the Surrey Hills and Chart Hills.  The route is mostly rural, passing through woods, and alongside fruit orchards and hop farms in Kent and links with the Stour Valley Walk near Pluckley in Kent. The trail was opened on 15 June 1980 and is jointly managed by Surrey and Kent Councils who fully updated it in 2012 (route, waymarking, online guide).

Much of the land is designated an Area of Outstanding Natural Beauty (AONB). The stretch from Hindhead to Leith Hill has formed part of the Surrey Hills AONB since 1958. The Sevenoaks Ridge, from the Surrey–Kent border to Borough Green, is included in the Kent Downs AONB.

The waymarks alone are not sufficient to follow the trail – an OS map, or the online guide with maps, is required.  An updated guide with maps and walk directions is available online from the Kent and Surrey Council websites. The original guidebook is out of print.  On Ordnance Survey Explorer map 145, a spur – also labelled Greensand Way – is shown from Thursley to Farnham; this is not part of the path.

Places en route

Places passed along the trail include: Hindhead, Thursley, Wormley, Hambledon, Hascombe, Shamley Green, Holmbury St Mary, Wotton, Westcott, Dorking, Brockham, Betchworth, Reigate, Earlswood, South Nutfield, Bletchingley, Godstone, Tandridge, Broadham Green, Limpsfield, Crockham Hill, Toys Hill, Ide Hill, Sevenoaks Weald, Knole Park, Shipbourne, Dunk's Green, West Peckham, Nettlestead Green, Yalding, Linton, Sutton Valence, Egerton, Pluckley, Little Chart, Hothfield, Kingsnorth and finally Hamstreet.

References

 The Greensand Way in Kent, 1992, Kent County Council,  (Out of print)
 Colton, Adam Mud, Sweat and Beers

External links

Kent Council – Homepage and online guide with maps of Kent and Surrey sections of the walk
Surrey Council – Homepage and online guide with maps of Surrey section of the walk
Saturday Walkers Club – Description, GPS data, and OS map of walk 
Route of the Greensand Way on OpenStreetMap (takes a long time to load e.g. 25 seconds)

Footpaths in Surrey
Footpaths in Kent
Long-distance footpaths in England